Poiana Lacului is a commune in Argeș County, Muntenia, Romania. It is composed of thirteen villages: Cătunași, Cepari, Dealu Orașului, Dealu Viilor, Dinculești, Gălețeanu, Gărdinești, Gâlcești, Metofu, Păduroiu din Deal, Păduroiu din Vale, Poiana Lacului and Sămara.

References

Communes in Argeș County
Localities in Muntenia